1952 Egypt Cup Final, was the final match of 1951–52 Egypt Cup, when Farouk (Zamalek SC now) beats Al-Ahly by 2–0.

Route to the final

Game description

Match details

References
 http://www.angelfire.com/ak/EgyptianSports/ZamalekInEgyptCup.html#1952
 http://www.angelfire.com/ak/EgyptianSports/ZamalekCupfinals.html#1952

1952
EC 1952
Al Ahly SC matches